Frango à Cafreal is a spicy chicken preparation consumed widely in the Indian state of Goa. The preparation originated from the Portuguese colonies in the African continent. It was introduced into the Goan cuisine by the Portuguese and the African soldiers serving under the Portuguese.

The generic preparation involves green chillies, fresh coriander leaves, onion, garlic, ginger, cinnamon, pepper, chilli, mace, clove powder and lime juice or vinegar. Chicken cafreal is always made from whole chicken legs, flavoured with the spices and herbs mentioned and then shallow fried. Chicken cafreal is usually accompanied by potato wedges and lime wedges. It is a popular dish in the bars and taverns of the state.

It is suspected that the dish originated in the Portuguese colonies in Africa, most likely in Mozambique. "À Cafreal" means "in the way of the Cafres" and cafre was the designation of the inhabitants of Cafraria, the region of Southern Africa inhabited by non-Muslim peoples (compare English kafir). According to this hypothesis, the cafreal chicken derives from the piri-piri chicken typical of those places. In many contexts and locations in the world, chicken piri-piri and chicken cafreal designate the same dish, but in Goa they are two very different things, even in color, since the first is red.

References 

Indian chicken dishes
Goan cuisine
Indian fusion cuisine
Portuguese fusion cuisine
Indian cuisine